This article documents the 1989–90 season of football club Coventry City F.C.

League table

Results

First Division

FA Cup

League Cup

Football League Trophy

Squad

Notes

References 

Coventry City F.C. seasons
Coventry City F.C.